Echo Peak may refer to:

 Echo Peak, a mountain peak in California
 Echo Peak (Wyoming), a mountain peak in Yellowstone National Park, Wyoming
 Echo Peak (Arizona), a mountain peak in Arizona 
 Echo Peak (Mariposa County, California), a mountain peak in California 
 Echo Peak (Idaho), a mountain peak in Idaho 
 Echo Peak (Montana), a mountain peak in Montana 
 Echo Peak (South Dakota), a mountain peak in South Dakota 
 Echo Peak (Washington), a mountain peak in Washington state

See also
 Echo Mountain (disambiguation)